National Freeway 2 is a connector freeway in Taiwan that traverses the special municipalities of Taoyuan City and New Taipei City. The freeway begins at Taiwan Taoyuan International Airport in Dayuan District, Taoyuan City, traveling in a Northwest-Southeast direction along northern Taoyuan City and ends in Yingge at the junction with National Freeway 3.

The freeway was initially signed as National Freeway 1A from 1980-1997 before the highway was extended to its current eastern terminus in Yingge. The initial segment of the freeway, between Taipei Taoyuan International Airport and National Freeway 1 is commonly known as Airport Connector, while the segment between National Freeway 1 and National Freeway 3 is a part of the Taoyuan Ring Road.

The airport is an important connector that links the international airport and Taoyuan HSR station with National Freeways 1 and 3. Like all east-west freeways in Taiwan, there are no tolls traveling along the entire freeway.

Route description 
National Freeway 2 begins as an 8-lane highway (4-lane in each direction) at Taiwan Taoyuan International Airport in Dayuan. The freeway then goes through the suburban districts of Dayuan and Luzhu (Nankan) before reaching National Freeway 1 in Taoyuan District (the former urban area of Taoyuan). In Luzhu, the freeway intersects Provincial Highway 31, which provides access to the nearby Taoyuan HSR station. After the interchange with National Freeway 1, the freeway continues as a 6-lane highway and intersects Daxing West Road in the southwestern edge of Taoyuan district before entering Bade. After the interchange with County Road 110B, the freeway enters New Taipei City for a short stretch before its terminus at National Freeway 3 in Yingge.

The entire freeway has a speed limit of 100km/h, except for the stretch between the airport and Dayuan interchange (70km/h for westbound traffic to the airport, and 90km/h for eastbound traffic from the airport).

Major cities along the route 

Luzhu District
Taoyuan District
Bade District

Exit list

Lanes
The lanes in each direction are listed below.
4 lanes:
Taiwan Taoyuan International Airport Top – Danan interchange
3 lanes:
Danan interchange – Yingge junction

History
The  section of National Freeway 2 between the Taiwan Taoyuan International Airport (previously named as Chiang Kai-shek International Airport) and National Freeway 1 was opened to traffic in November of 1980 to provide faster connections to the main international airport of Taiwan. The freeway was originated designated as National Freeway 1A, a branch of National Freeway 1. Initially a 4-lane highway, this section was eventually widened to 8 lanes in 2011 to alleviate traffic congestion. 

When the road was extended to Yingge to connect the newly constructed National Freeway 3 in 1997, the entire route was renumbered as National Freeway 2. In January 2006 Dazhu interchange was built to provide an easy access to the newly constructed Taoyuan HSR station. In April 2013, an interchange to the Wugu-Yangmei elevated road, a local bypass to National Freeway 1, was built. The interchange allows westbound entrance for traffic to the airport and eastbound exit for traffic from the airport.

On January 8, 2023, a spur route of the highway, known as Freeway 2A, connecting Freeway 2 and Provincial Highway 15, opened.

See also

 Highway system in Taiwan

References

External links

Freeway No. 02